is a Japanese feminine given name. In Japanese, the word megumi means "blessing; grace."

Possible writings
While the word megumi means blessing and can be written using that kanji, it may also be spelled using other kanji, such as the kanji for love, or written using kana.
恵,   "blessing, grace"
愛,   "love"
恵美, "blessing, favor; beauty"
旋美, "rotate, turn; beauty"
寵美, "love, affection, patronage; beauty"
巡美, "circumference, patrol; beauty"
廻美, "round, game, revolve, go around, circumference; beauty"
斡美, "administer, go around, rule; beauty"

People with the name
Megumi Fujii (藤井 恵, born 1974), retired Japanese mixed martial artist
Megumi Furuya (めぐみ, born 1981), Japanese gravure idol, tarento, actress, and singer, who simply uses the stage name Megumi
Megumi Hayashibara (林原 めぐみ, born 1967), Japanese voice actress, lyricist and singer
Megumi Han (潘 めぐみ, born 1989), Japanese actress and voice actress
, Japanese artist
, Japanese sport shooter
Megumi Iseda (伊勢田 愛, born 1987), Japanese sailor
, Japanese volleyball player
, Japanese synchronized swimmer
Megumi Kadonosono (門之園 恵美, born 1970), Japanese animator and character designer
, Japanese field hockey player
Megumi Kagurazaka (神楽坂 恵, born 1982), Japanese actress and model
Megumi Kawamura (河村めぐみ, born 1983), Japanese volleyball player and fashion model
, Japanese model, actress and singer
Megumi Kurihara (栗原恵, born 1984), Japanese volleyball player
Megumi Kudo (工藤めぐみ), Japanese professional wrestler
, Japanese voice actress
Megumi Mizusawa (水沢めぐみ, born 1963), Japanese manga artist
Megumi Murakami (村上 愛, born 1992), J-pop singer, former member of Cute
Megumi Nakajima (中島 愛, born 1989), Japanese Filipina singer and voice actress
Megumi Odaka (小高恵美, born 1972), Japanese voice actress and actress
Megumi Ogata (緒方 恵美, born 1965), Japanese voice actress and singer 
Megumi Ōhara (大原 めぐみ, born 1975), Japanese voice actress
Megumi Okina (奥菜 恵, born 1979), Japanese actress and J-pop singer
, Japanese filmmaker and writer
, Japanese actress and television personality
, Japanese high jumper
Megumi Seki (関 めぐみ, born 1985), Japanese actress
Megumi Tachikawa (立川 恵), Japanese manga artist
Megumi Takamoto (高本 めぐみ, born 1985), Japanese voice actress
, Japanese women's footballer
Megumi Toyoguchi (豊口 めぐみ, born 1978), Japanese voice actress
Megumi Urawa (浦和 めぐみ, born 1965), Japanese voice actress
, Japanese voice actress
Megumi Yokota (横田 めぐみ, 1964-1994 or 2004), one of at least thirteen Japanese citizens kidnapped by North Korea in the late 1970s and early 1980s
, Japanese actress
, Japanese badminton player
Megumi Yasu, Japanese gravure idol, model and actress

Fictional characters
 Megumi Aino of HappinessCharge PreCure!
Megumi Amano of Urotsukidoji
Megumi Amatsuka of Cheeky Angel
Megumi Ayase of Mahou no Tenshi Creamy Mami
Megumi Eto of Battle Royale
Megumi Fushiguro of Jujutsu Kaisen
Megumi Hanajima of Fruits Basket
Megumi Imae of WataMote
Megumi Iruma from Ultraman Tiga
Megumi Kanoya of Ouran High School Host Club
Megumi Kato of Saekano: How to Raise a Boring Girlfriend
Megumi Minami of Tantei Gakuen Q
Megumi Misaki (aka Blue Dolphin) of Choujuu Sentai Liveman
Megumi Momono of Mahoraba ~Heartful Days~
Megumi Morisato of Oh My Goddess!
Megumi Natsu of Is the Order a Rabbit?
Megumi Noda of Nodame Cantabile
Megumi Oumi of Zatch Bell! (Konjiki no Gash!!)
Megumi Reinard of Nadesico
Megumi Sagano of School Rumble
Megumi Sakura of School-Live!
Megumi Sawatari of Megatokyo
Megumi Shimizu of Shiki
Megumi Shitow of RahXephon
Megumi Sokabe of K-on!
Megumi Takani of Rurouni Kenshin (Samurai X)
Megumi Tadokoro of Food Wars!: Shokugeki no Soma
Megumi Yamamoto of Special A
Megumi Yoshikawa from Princess Princess and The Day of Revolution
 Megumi, a minor character in the video game Guilty Gear
 Megumi of the video games series Crash Bandicoot

References

Japanese feminine given names